Music and Medicine is a quarterly peer-reviewed academic journal that covers research on the intersection of music and medicine. Its editors-in-chief are Joanne V. Loewy (Mount Sinai Beth Israel) and Ralph Spintge (Sportkrankenhaus Hellersen). It was established in 2009 and originally published by SAGE Publications. As of 2014 it is published by the International Association for Music and Medicine.

Abstracting and indexing 
The journal is abstracted and indexed in CINAHL and PsycINFO.

References

External links 
 
 International Association for Music and Medicine

English-language journals
Music journals
Publications established in 2009
General medical journals
Quarterly journals